KSAB (99.9 FM, Tejano 99.9) is a radio station broadcasting a tejano music format. Licensed to Robstown, Texas, United States, the station serves the Corpus Christi area.  The station is currently owned by iHeartMedia, Inc.  The station's studios and offices are located on Old Brownsville Road in Corpus Christi (near the airport), and its transmitter tower is located in Robstown, Texas.

History
The station was assigned the call letters KROB-FM on July 24, 1978.  On July 11, 1991, the station changed its call sign to the current KSAB. The radio station boasts a signature Tejano music format with a mix of music of the 80's and 90's to today's Tejano hits. The top rated morning show with Dan and Barbi airs from 5am to 10am weekdays. Veteran Tejano broadcaster Danny Perez delivers his show weekday afternoons 2pm to 7pm. KSAB Tejano 99.9 also broadcasts online via the iHeartRadio app.

References

External links
 
 

SAB
Radio stations established in 1978
IHeartMedia radio stations
Tejano music